is an Echizen Railway Katsuyama Eiheiji Line railway station located in the city of Fukui, Fukui Prefecture, Japan.

Lines

Station layout
The station consists of one side platform serving a single bi-directional track. The station is unattended.

Adjacent stations

History
It was renamed to its present name in 1929. Operations were halted from June 25, 2001. The station reopened on July 20, 2003 as an Echizen Railway station.

Surrounding area
There is a cluster of homes and businesses around the station, with rice fields further away. Fukui City Higashi-Fujishima Elementary School is across the street.
Fukui Prefectural Route 164 is outside the station's east exit;  passes to the south.

See also
 List of railway stations in Japan

References

External links

  

Railway stations in Fukui Prefecture
Railway stations in Japan opened in 1914
Katsuyama Eiheiji Line
Fukui (city)